Alberto Malaspina may refer to:

Albert Malaspina (1162–1206), troubadour
Alberto Malaspina (painter) (1853–1903), Italian painter